Seule Soromon (born 14 August 1984) is an association football striker from Vanuatu who currently plays for Wairarapa United in the Central Premier League.

He hails from Mele, which is located northwest of Port Vila.

Club career

The prolific Soromon played for Suva F.C. in Fiji and for New Zealand Central Premier League side Wairarapa United. In October 2008 he trained with NZFC side Team Wellington but then joined fellow NZFC outfit Hawke's Bay United. He signed up with Manawatu for the 2009–2010 season to form an all South Pacific strikeforce with Samoan striker Desmond Fa'aiuaso.

He ended that season as the league's top goalscorer with 11 goals from only 12 matches.

International career

He made his debut for the Vanuatu national football team in an August 2007 World Cup qualification match against Samoa. He scored four goals in his second international, against American Samoa.

References

External links
 

1984 births
Living people
Vanuatuan footballers
Vanuatu international footballers
Vanuatuan expatriate footballers
Hawke's Bay United FC players
YoungHeart Manawatu players
Suva F.C. players
2008 OFC Nations Cup players
New Zealand Football Championship players
Expatriate association footballers in New Zealand
Expatriate footballers in Fiji
Vanuatuan expatriate sportspeople in New Zealand
Vanuatuan expatriate sportspeople in Fiji
Association football forwards